Gaynor is both a surname and a given name. Notable people with the name include:

Surname
 Adam Gaynor (born 1963), American guitarist
 Barrington Gaynor (1965–2011), Jamaican footballer
 Ciara Gaynor (born 1979), Irish camogie player
 Dave Gaynor, English drummer
 Gloria Gaynor (born 1943), American singer
 Janet Gaynor (1906–1984), American actress
 Jessie Gaynor (1863–1921), American composer
 John A. Gaynor (1846–1915), American politician
 Katie Gaynor (born 1977), Australian baseball player
 Len Gaynor (born 1944), Irish hurling manager
 Len Gaynor (footballer) (born 1949), English footballer
 Mel Gaynor (born 1960), British musician
 Mitzi Gaynor (born 1931), American actress, singer and dancer
 Pete Gaynor (born 1958), U.S. Administrator of FEMA
 Ross Gaynor (born 1987), Irish footballer
 Tomas Gaynor (born 1991), Australian rapper, singer and songwriter, known professionally as Allday
 Tommy Gaynor (born 1963), Irish footballer
 William Jay Gaynor (1849–1913), mayor of New York City

Given name 
 Gaynor Arnold, Welsh author
 Gaynor Barnes (born 1961), English television journalist
 Gaynor Faye (born 1971), English television actress
 Gaynor Hopkins (born 1951), the birth name of Welsh singer Bonnie Tyler
 Gaynor Lucas, minor character in the BBC soap opera EastEnders
 Gaynor Rowlands (1883–1906), Edwardian actress of Welsh descent

References 

Welsh feminine given names